The men's Madison at the 2008 Summer Olympics was held on 19 August at the Laoshan Velodrome.

This track cycling event consists of a single race. This race is a 50 kilometre, 200 lap race. Cyclists compete in pairs, with one resting as the other rides. Placing is determined first by laps, then by points. Points are awarded based on intermediate sprints held every 20 laps. The first finisher in each sprint earns 5 points, the second gets 3, the third finisher earns 2, and the fourth place cyclist after each sprint gets 1 point. Ties after both laps and points are broken by the placing in the last sprint.

Argentina wins the gold medal.

Results

References

Track cycling at the 2008 Summer Olympics
Cycling at the Summer Olympics – Men's madison
Men's events at the 2008 Summer Olympics